Erythema marginatum is a type of erythema (redness of the skin or mucous membranes) involving pink rings on the torso and inner surfaces of the limbs which come and go for as long as several months. It is found primarily on extensor surfaces.

An association with bradykinin has been proposed in the case of hereditary angioedema.

Presentation
The rings are barely raised and are non-itchy. The face is generally spared.

Associated conditions
It occurs in less than 5% of patients with rheumatic fever, but is considered a major Jones criterion when it does occur.  The four other major criteria include carditis, polyarthritis, Sydenham's chorea, and subcutaneous nodules. In this case, it is often associated with Group A streptococcal infection, otherwise known as Streptococcus pyogenes infection, which can be detected with an ASO titer.

It is an early feature of rheumatic fever and not pathognomonic of it. It may be associated with mild myocarditis (inflammation of heart muscle). It is also seen in conditions like allergic drug reactions, sepsis and glomerulonephritis.

It often occurs as a harbinger of attacks in hereditary angioedema.  In this case it may occur several hours or up to a day before an attack.

Diagnosis

Types
Some sources distinguish between the following:
 "Erythema marginatum rheumaticum"
 "Erythema marginatum perstans"

Treatment

Erythema marginatum can be treated with hydrocortisone and adrenocorticotropc hormone (ACTH).

References

External links 

Bacterium-related cutaneous conditions
Erythemas
Pediatrics